The 1993–94 snooker season was a series of snooker tournaments played between August 1993 and May 1994. The following table outlines the results for ranking events and the invitational events.


Calendar

Official rankings 

The top 16 of the world rankings, these players automatically played in the final rounds of the world ranking events and were invited for the Masters.

Notes

References

External links

1993
Season 1994
Season 1993